Doc Hollywood is a 1991 American romantic comedy film directed by Michael Caton-Jones and written by Daniel Pyne along with Jeffrey Price and Peter S. Seaman, based on Neil B. Shulman's book What? Dead...Again? The film stars Michael J. Fox, Julie Warner, Barnard Hughes, Woody Harrelson, David Ogden Stiers, Frances Sternhagen, and Bridget Fonda.

The film was shot on location in Micanopy, Florida.

Plot
Having completed his medical residency in a Washington, D.C. hospital, Dr. Benjamin "Ben" Stone begins driving to Beverly Hills for a job interview with noted plastic surgeon Dr. Halberstrom. While passing through the small town of Grady, South Carolina, Ben crashes into a fence whilst trying to avoid hitting a cow. Unfortunately, the fence belongs to Judge Evans, who then sentences him to 32 hours of community service at the town's medical clinic. 

Mayor Nick Nicholson and the town's reception committee meet Ben, hoping to hire him to replace Dr. Aurelius Hogue, who is planning to retire. While his 1956 Porsche Speedster is being repaired, Ben tends to patients and flirts with ambulance driver Vialula (better known as "Lou"), a single mother of a four-year-old daughter. Local insurance agent Hank Gordon also courts Lou, while Nancy Lee, the mayor's daughter, pursues Ben.

The town's residents begin to warm to Ben, and he in turn starts to enjoy small-town life. Hogue, initially dismissive of Ben as being too young and too inexperienced, changes his mind when he has a heart attack and Ben saves his life. Grateful, Hogue privately calls Halberstrom explaining Ben's delay due to his enforced community service (which he explains as being "volunteer work"), while Judge Evans releases Ben from his remaining sentence. 

On the eve of Ben's departure, he shares an intimate evening with Lou. Unwilling to exploit the situation or incite Hank's jealousy, Ben secretly leaves town at night. Near the town's reservoir, Ben happens upon a local man whose wife is in labor inside their car. After a short hesitation, he stops to help. During the delivery, Ben's Porsche is once again damaged when a fatigued carnival truck driver knocks into it.

Ben prepares to leave the next day. The community has chipped in and bought him a plane ticket to Los Angeles. Lou, not wanting Ben to waste his talents in a small town, hides her feelings for him, and says she is marrying Hank.

Dr. Halberstrom hires Ben based on Hogue's recommendation. Beverly Hills' superficiality soon leaves Ben, who grew up in a small town, feeling depressed and isolated. A few weeks later, Hank and Nancy Lee arrive in Los Angeles, bringing Ben's repaired car with them. After Hank tells Ben that he and Lou broke off their engagement, Ben returns to Grady and reconciles with her.

Cast
 Michael J. Fox as Dr. Benjamin "Ben" Stone, an aspiring surgeon.
 Julie Warner as Vialula/"Lou", a tomboyish ambulance driver living in Grady who is a single mother and is a law student.
 Barnard Hughes as Dr. Aurelius Hogue, an elderly doctor in Grady.
 Woody Harrelson as Hank Gordon, Grady's local insurance salesman.
 David Ogden Stiers as Mayor Nick Nicholson, the mayor of Grady who is also the owner of the town's café.
 Frances Sternhagen as Lillian, a member of Grady's welcoming committee.
 Bridget Fonda as Nancy Lee Nicholson, the daughter of Nick Nicholson.
 Roberts Blossom as Judge Evans, the judge who sentences Ben to community service.
 Eyde Byrde as Nurse Packer, Grady's residential nurse who oversees Ben's community service.
 Mel Winkler as Melvin, a mechanic charged with the duty to restore Ben's car.
 George Hamilton as Dr. Halberstrom, a Beverly Hills doctor.
 Time Winters as Kyle Owens
 K.T. Vogt as Mary Owens

Production

The film is based on the book What? Dead…Again? by Neil B. Shulman, about his time as a doctor in rural Georgia. He was an associate producer on the film.

The budget was $20 million. The story location was moved from Georgia to South Carolina but filmed on location in Florida in the towns of Micanopy and McIntosh, south of Gainesville. Further filming took place in Los Angeles.

Soundtrack
The film's soundtrack features the Chesney Hawkes song "The One and Only", which reached number 10 on the Billboard Hot 100 singles chart. It also includes Filip Kutev's "Polegnala e Todora", although his name is spelled Philip Kouter.

Reception

Critical response
Rotten Tomatoes gives the film a score of 68% based on reviews from 50 critics. The critical consensus reads: "Doc Hollywood isn't particularly graceful in its attempt to put a '90s spin on its Capraesque formula, but a light touch and a charming cast make its flaws easy to forgive." On Metacritic it has a score of 56% based on reviews from 20 critics, indicating "mixed or average reviews". Audiences polled by CinemaScore gave the film an average grade of "B+" on an A+ to F scale.

Janet Maslin of The New York Times wrote that "Mr. Fox, blithe and funny as ever, amusingly shrugs off each new surprise the film has to offer", adding that "while retaining his boyish appeal, Mr. Fox also seems a shade more substantial this time, possibly because he is seen making life-or-death decisions when not fielding comic lines". She did, however, say that "the screenplay, by Jeffrey Price, Peter S. Seaman and Daniel Pyne, is occasionally sharp-tongued but more often pleasantly knee-deep in rustic corn".

Peter Rainer of the Los Angeles Times remarked that "[I]f you have any doubt as to the outcome, you haven't been paying attention to the latest self-serving movie trend. The back-to-basics, anti-greed message of Doc Hollywood has been all over the screens this season, from TV's Northern Exposure to the movies' City Slickers, Regarding Henry, Life Stinks and The Doctor". He added:

Roger Ebert rated the film a three out of four stars stating "On the basis of the movie's trailer, I was expecting Doc Hollywood to be a comedy. And it is a comedy. But it surprised me by also being a love story, and a pretty good one – the kind where the lovers are smart enough to know all the reasons why they shouldn't get together, but too much in love to care."

Box office
Doc Hollywood debuted at number three in the U.S. box office.

Cars plagiarism
The makers of the Disney/Pixar film Cars have been accused of plagiarizing its plot from this film. "Many reviewers also felt that Cars' plot was too indebted to the 1991 Michael J Fox comedy Doc Hollywood, in which a hotshot Los Angeles doctor learns a new set of values when he is stranded in an average American town. 'It just rips off Doc Hollywood, almost note for note,' said Christy Lemire of the San Francisco Chronicle." Critic Simon Kinnear of Total Film concurred, stating "Actually, this one pretty much is just 'Doc Hollywood with cars.'"

References

External links

 
 

1991 films
1991 romantic comedy films
American romantic comedy films
1990s English-language films
Films directed by Michael Caton-Jones
Films set in Los Angeles
Films set in South Carolina
Films set in Washington, D.C.
Films shot in Florida
Films shot in Los Angeles
Films shot in Virginia
Films with screenplays by Jeffrey Price and Peter S. Seaman
Warner Bros. films
Films scored by Carter Burwell
Films based on American novels
1990s American films